August Förster is a German piano manufacturing company (also rendered "Foerster," occasionally "Forster," officially "August Förster GmbH Kunsthandwerklicher Flügel-und-Pianobau") that currently has a staff of 40 employees and produces around 120 grand pianos and 150 uprights per year.

History
On April 1, 1859, August Förster opened a small piano workshop in Löbau, Germany, expanding to a factory on Löbau's Jahn Street in 1862. Still in use today, this facility has been enlarged and modernized by the Förster family and remains the exclusive site for the manufacture of the original August Förster piano.

In 1897, Caesar Förster succeeded his father August as manager of the company and opened a second factory in Jiříkov, Bohemia (later Czechoslovakia and the Czech Republic) in 1900.

The owner Franz Cäsar Förster was awarded an imperial and royal warrant of appointment to the court of Austria-Hungary.

In 1937 the company manufactured one of the first electric pianos, the “Vierling-Förster” piano, developed by Oskar Vierling at the Heinrich Institute for Oscillation Research at the Technical University of Berlin using electromagnetic pickups.

In 1948 the factory in Jiříkov was nationalized.  Under new state-sanctioned management many pianos of good quality were produced, but since 1948 the Czechoslovak-made pianos have had no connection or relationship to the German August Förster piano.  This "other" August Förster is currently produced in the Czech Republic by the Petrof Piano Company and sold in Canada and certain European countries.

In 1972, the final phase of East German nationalization transformed the company into the state-owned "VEB Flügel-und-Pianobau Löbau." Although still under the management of Wolfgang Förster, the company was annexed as part of the German Piano-Union, Leipzig. The family name was added back into the official company name in 1976, resulting in instruments branded "VEB Förster Pianos Löbau."  Also in 1976, the company began its first exports to the United States.

Noted Customers
Many prominent musicians have favored the German-made Förster piano. Among them have been Richard Strauss and Sergei Prokofiev, both owners of Förster pianos, and Giacomo Puccini, who wrote a number of his operas while working at a Förster piano. Robert Fischer, Alex Duke and Anton Kuerti are also noted for their regard of the August Förster piano.

Awards
Förster pianos have won many awards for quality and tone, including the "Verleihung der Goldmedaille für den Rokokoflügel" in 1987.

In The Piano Book by Larry Fine, the German-made August Förster piano receives the highest possible rating in the areas of performance, quality control, and confidence (Fine's term for general durability).  In his "High Quality Performance Pianos" category, Fine ranks the modern August Förster piano as just below such internationally respected instruments as C. Bechstein, Grotrian, and Bösendorfer.  In addition, Fine praises the modern Förster piano for its "remarkable bass," and also comments on a particular "responsiveness" of the Renner action when observed in the Förster application.

In popular culture
An August Förster piano was seen by audiences worldwide as the featured instrument in the movie The Pianist.

Current Grand Piano Models

Current Upright Piano Models

References

Further reading
 "Altenburg Piano Hosts August Forster." Music Trades 148.9 (2000): 53.
 Ehrlich, Cyril. The Piano: A History. Oxford, England: Clarendon Press, 1990. 
 Fine, Larry. The Piano Book: Buying and Owning a New or Used Piano, Fourth Edition. Jamaica Plain, MA: Brookside Press, 2005. 
 Good, Edwin. Giraffes, Black Dragons, and Other Pianos: A Technological History from Cristofori to the Modern Concert Grand, Second Edition. Stanford, CA: Stanford University Press, 2001. 
 Williams, John-Paul.  The Piano: An Inspirational Guide to the Piano and Its Place in History.  New York: Billboard Books, 2002.

External links
 Official homepage

Companies based in Saxony
German brands
Löbau
Piano manufacturing companies of Germany
Purveyors to the Imperial and Royal Court